Karim Ebrahim Shakar (born December 23, 1945) is a Bahraini Ambassador.

Career
In 1970 he joined the Ministry of Foreign Affairs (Bahrain).
From 1972 to 1976 he was first secretary at the mission next the Headquarters of the United Nations.
From 1977 to 1981 he was Chief of the International Relations and Organizations Section in the Ministry of Foreign Affairs (Bahrain).
From 1979 to 1982 he was member of Bahrain - Singapore Joint Committee.
In 1986 he was Chairman of G-77 Geneva Chapter.
From 1982 to 1987 he had Exequatur as Consul General in Geneva and was Permanent Representative next the United Nations Office at Geneva.
In 1984 he got concurrent Diplomatic accreditation as non resident ambassador in Vienna (Austria), Bonn (Germany) and Permanent Representative to next the United Nations Office at Vienna.
From 1987 to 1990 he was Permanent Representative next the Headquarters of the United Nations in New York.
In 1988 he was Vice President of the United Nations General Assembly, presided over a number of Plenary Meetings of the UNGA during its Forty-fifth Session.
From 1990 to 1995 he was ambassador in London (United Kingdom) with simultaneously non-resident Diplomatic accreditation as Ambassador to Dublin (Republic of Ireland), the Netherlands and Denmark.
From August 1996 to August 2001 he was Member of the Board of Bahrain Promotions and Marketing Board.
From August 1995 to August 2001 he was director, International Directorate of  the Ministry of Foreign Affairs (Bahrain).
From September 2001 to June 2007 he was ambassador in Beijing (People's Republic of China) with concurrent accreditation as non - resident Ambassador to Malaysia, Thailand, Manila (Philippines), Republic of Singapore and Ulaanbaatar (Mongolia).
In January 2008 he was appointed as Bahrain's Focal Point to the United Nations, Alliance of Civilizations, Dialogue between Civilizations, Inter Religious and Inter Faith.
From July 2007 to 16 August 2009 he was Ambassador-at-Large in the Ministry of Foreign Affairs (Bahrain)
Since August 17, 2009 he was Undersecretary for International Affairs in the Ministry of Foreign Affairs (Bahrain).

References

1945 births
Living people
Permanent Representatives of Bahrain to the United Nations
Ambassadors of Bahrain to the United Kingdom
Ambassadors of Bahrain to China